The 2015–16 season was FC Barcelona Lassa's 90th in existence and the club's 33rd consecutive season in the top flight of Spanish basketball. Barcelona was involved in four competitions.

Players

Squad information

Players in

|}

Total spending:  €315,000

Players out

|}

Total income:  €0

Total expenditure: €315,000

Club

Technical staff

Kit
Supplier: Nike / Sponsor: Lassa Tyres

Pre-season and friendlies

Competitions

Overall

Overview

Supercopa de España

Liga ACB

League table

Results summary

Results by round

Matches

Results overview

ACB Playoffs

Quarterfinals

Semifinals

Finals

Euroleague

Regular season

Top 16

Playoffs

Copa del Rey

Statistics

Liga ACB

ACB Playoffs

Copa del Rey

Supercopa de España

Euroleague

References

External links
 Official website
 FC Barcelona Lassa at ACB.com 
 FC Barcelona Lassa at Euroleague.net

Barcelona
 
Barcelona